Otsup is a surname. Notable people with the surname include:

Ludmilla Chiriaeff (née Otsup; 1924–1996), Latvian-Canadian ballet dancer, choreographer, teacher, and company director
Pyotr Otsup (1883–1963), Soviet photographer